'Arthur Devis (19 February 1712 – 25 July 1787) was an English artist whose father, Anthony, was progenitor of what became a family dynasty of painters and writers. The place of Arthur Devis in art history is generally as painter of the type of portrait now called a conversation piece. After moving to London and apprenticeship to a Flemish topographical artist there, he switched to portraiture and acquired a considerable reputation, although this success did not last. Unable to adapt to later fashionable artistic currents, his commissions declined and his work was largely forgotten after his death until the 20th century revival of interest in the conversation piece.

Biography
Arthur Devis was born in Preston, Lancashire, the eldest son of Anthony Devis, a carpenter and bookseller who ultimately become a freeman of the town and a member of the town council. It may have been his father who was  responsible for introducing Devis to the Flemish painter Peter Tillemans, who became his teacher. During the early 1730s, Devis is known to have been an assistant in Tillemans's London studio, apparently copying views of Italy by artists such as Pannini and Marco Ricci. Not surprisingly, the first work Devis painted on commission, a depiction of a house within its park, also shows his interest in landscape ("Hoghton Tower from Duxon Hill, Lancashire", see below). By 1737, however, he had become a portrait painter. In 1745 he established a studio in Great Queen Street,  Lincoln's Inn Fields, the location of an academy of painting  opened  in 1711. By this time he had acquired a considerable artistic reputation.

Drawing upon his father's civic position, Devis also found his clientele among the members of pro-Jacobite Lancashire families and the network of their connections. A story was handed down within his family that Devis himself so resembled the 'young pretender', Charles Edward Stuart, that being taken for the prince on one occasion, he was arrested and in danger for his life. The account later made its way into the revised edition of Matthew Pilkington's Dictionary of Painters and was made a dramatic fragment by the painter's descendant, Martin Farquhar Tupper, as "a true family anecdote" in "The Pretender and his Double" (1881).  

Devis was a hard-working craftsman, receiving his greatest number of commissions for portraits between 1748 and 1758, after which he failed to keep abreast of later developments in the work of such artists as Joshua Reynolds and Johann Zoffany. As a consequence he came to be considered mannered and old-fashioned. By 1765, Lord John Cavendish was commenting on a projected portrait of his nephew by Devis: "I am much afraid it will be frightful for I understand, his pictures are all of a sort; they are whole lengths of about 2 feet long & the person is always represented in a genteel attitude, either leaning against a pillar, or standing by a flower pot, or leading an Italian greyhound on a string, or in some other ingenious pose."

Despite his fading reputation, in 1768 Devis became president of the newly founded Free Society of Artists, where he also exhibited works from 1761 onwards, but he was never admitted to membership of the rival Royal Academy. For income he was obliged to take up restoring pictures, though this could be remunerative. As early as 1762 he was working on the ancestral portraits of his patron Sir Roger Newdigate at Arbury Hall. And for repairing and restoring the "Painted Hall" of the Royal Naval Hospital, Greenwich between 1777 and 1778, he received the fee of one thousand pounds.

In 1783 Devis sold all the paintings in his possession and in 1787 died in retirement in Brighton. He was buried in the churchyard of St. Mary Paddington, London.

Work

Family

Devis married Elizabeth Faulkner (1719–1788) at St Katharine's by the Tower, London, on 20 July 1742. Of the marriage were born twenty-two children, only six of whom survived past infancy. Two sons, Thomas Anthony Devis (1757–1810) and his younger brother, Arthur William Devis, became painters. One daughter, Ellin Devis, was a schoolmistress and author of the popular grammar The Accidence (1775). Devis's half-brother Anthony Devis also was a painter, as was a son-in-law, Robert Marris, who as a young man had lived and travelled with Anthony Devis and later married Arthur Devis's daughter Frances. In his turn, Marris had for pupil Richard Corbould, who painted miniatures of Devis and his wife for the model tomb commissioned after their deaths by their daughter Ellin. The family's creative dynasty was also to continue into the following century. For example, the physician Martin Tupper married Robert Marris's only daughter, Ellin Devis Marris, and their eldest son, the poet and writer Martin Farquhar Tupper, married his cousin Isabella Devis, daughter of Arthur William Devis. The daughters of this marriage went on to publish Poems by Three Sisters in 1864, while one of them, Ellin Isabelle, left a biographical account of the family at the end of the century.

Gallery

References

Sources
 Belsey, Hugh.  "Devis" in Oxford Art Online (updated 04/07/04)
 
 
 Pavière, Sydney Herbert,  The Devis Family of Painters,  Lewis, Leigh-on-Sea 1950
 Polite Society by Arthur Devis, Harris Museum and Art Gallery, Preston, Exh. cat., 1983

External links

 Arthur Devis at Artcycolopaedia
 Arthur Devis at World Wide Art Resources
 Works by Arthur Devis at Tate Britain
 Devis's Mr and Mrs Atherton (c1743), at the Walker Art Gallery

1712 births
1787 deaths
18th-century English painters
18th-century English male artists
English male painters
Artists from Preston, Lancashire
English portrait painters